Demodex foveolator is a hair follicle mite found in epidermal pits of the lesser white-toothed shrew, Crocidura suaveolens.

It is known from shrews caught in south Bohemia, former Czechoslovakia.

References

Trombidiformes
Animals described in 1984